Mniarogekko is a genus of lizards in the family Diplodactylidae endemic to New Caledonia. It includes two species:

Mniarogekko chahoua (Bavay, 1869)
Mniarogekko jalu Bauer, A. Whitaker, Sadlier, & Jackman, 2012

References

 
Lizard genera
Taxa named by Aaron M. Bauer
Taxa named by Anthony Whitaker
Taxa named by Ross Allen Sadlier
Taxa named by Todd R. Jackman
Geckos of New Caledonia